Aglossa aglossalis is a species of snout moth in the genus Aglossa. It was described by Ragonot, in 1892, and is known from Algeria, Tunisia, Libya, Iraq, Iran, India, Pakistan, Sudan and the United Arab Emirates.

References

Pyralini
Moths described in 1892
Snout moths of Africa
Moths of Asia